Henry K. Moeller (December 11, 1849 – January 5, 1925) was an American prelate of the Catholic Church. He served as bishop of the Diocese of Columbus in Ohio (1900–1903) and archbishop of the Archdiocese of Cincinnati in Ohio (1904–1925).

Biography

Early life 
Henry Moeller was born on December 11, 1849, in Cincinnati, Ohio, to Bernard and Teresa (née Witte) Moeller, who were immigrants from Westphalia. He was the oldest of seven children; one of his sisters became a nun, and two brothers also became priests. His father worked as a cabinet maker and carpenter before becoming a bricklayer and building contractor. Henry Moeller was baptized by Father John Henry Luers the day after his birth, and received his early education at the parochial school of St. Joseph Parish in the West End of Cincinnati.

In 1863, Moeller entered St. Xavier College in Cincinnati, graduating with highest honors in 1869. He was then sent by Archbishop John Purcell to study philosophy and theology at the Pontifical North American College in Rome. In his competitive examinations, he won three first prizes in theology. Moeller was ordained a subdeacon on November 2, 1875, and a deacon on the following November 10.

Priesthood 

On June 10, 1876, Moeller was ordained to the priesthood for the Archdiocese of Cincinnati by Archbishop Giulio Lenti at the Basilica of St. John Lateran in Rome. That same year he received his Doctor of Divinity degree from the Urban College of Propaganda in Rome. Following his return to Ohio, Moeller was appointed pastor of St. Patrick Parish in Bellefontaine in September 1876. He then served as a professor at Mount St. Mary's Seminary of the West in Norwood, Ohio, from 1877 to 1879.

In November 1879, Moeller was granted a leave of absence from the Archdiocese of Cincinnati to assist Bishop Silas Chatard of the Diocese of Vincennes in Indiana. He served as secretary to Bishop Chatard until 1880, when he was recalled to Cincinnati by Archbishop William Elder to serve as his own secretary. Moeller served as chancellor of the archdiocese from 1886 to 1900.

Bishop of Columbus 
On April 6, 1900, Moeller was appointed the third bishop of the Diocese of Columbus by Pope Leo XIII. He received his episcopal consecration on August 25, 1900, from Archbishop Elder, with Bishops Henry Richter and Thomas Byrne serving as co-consecrators, at St. Peter in Chains Cathedral in Cincinnati. He was installed at St. Joseph Cathedral in Columbus on August 27. 

During his brief tenure in Columbus, Moeller reduced the debt the diocese incurred from building the cathedral, established parish boundaries for Franklin County, and created three new parishes and four missions. In 1902, he presided over the fifth diocesan synod, which set regulations for the needs of the clergy and people of the diocese.

Coadjutor Archbishop and Archbishop of Cincinnati
Moeller was named coadjutor archbishop by Pope Pius X of the Archdiocese of Cincinnati and Titular Archbishop of Areopolis on April 27, 1903. As coadjutor, he assumed the administrative duties of the archdiocese. Upon the death of Archbishop Elder, Moeller succeeded him to become the fourth archbishop of Cincinnati on October 31, 1904. He was formally installed as archbishop and received the pallium on February 15, 1905. In 1921, Moeller condemned several forms of dancing (including the Shimmy and Camel Walk) as well as bare female shoulders at social functions.

Death and legacy 
Henry Moeller died in Cincinnati on January 5, 1925, at age 75. He is buried in the mausoleum at St. Joseph Cemetery in Price Hill.Archbishop Moeller High School, a parochial school near Cincinnati, Ohio, was named for him.

References

External links

Succession of Archbishop Henry Moeller
Archbishop Moeller High School
History of Archbishop Moeller High School

1849 births
1925 deaths
Roman Catholic archbishops of Cincinnati
Roman Catholic bishops of Columbus
American people of German descent
20th-century Roman Catholic archbishops in the United States
St. Xavier High School (Ohio) alumni